The Lubbock Hawks were a women's professional basketball team in the National Women's Basketball League (NWBL).  Based in Lubbock, Texas, they played in 2005.

External links
NWBL website (archive link)

Basketball teams in Lubbock, Texas